The Society for the Protection of Ancient Buildings (SPAB) (also known as Anti-Scrape) is an amenity society founded by William Morris, Philip Webb, and others in 1877 to oppose the destructive 'restoration' of ancient buildings occurring in Victorian England. "Ancient" is used here in the wider sense rather than the more usual modern sense of "pre-medieval."

Morris was particularly concerned about the practice, which he described as "forgery", of attempting to return functioning buildings to an idealized state from the distant past, often involving the removal of elements added in their later development, which he thought had contributed to their interest as documents of the past. Instead, he proposed that ancient buildings should be repaired, not restored, to protect as cultural heritage their entire history. Today, these principles are widely accepted.

The architect A.R. Powys served as the Secretary of the SPAB for 25 years in the early 20th century.

Organization and activities
Today, the SPAB still operates according to Morris's original manifesto. It campaigns, advises, runs training programmes and courses, conducts research, and publishes information. As one of the National Amenity Societies, the Society is a statutory consultee on alterations to listed buildings, and by law must be notified of any application in England and Wales to demolish any listed building in whole or in part.

The society, which is a registered charity, is based at 37 Spital Square, London.

For its dedicated service to heritage, the society was awarded the European Union Prize for Cultural Heritage / Europa Nostra Award in 2012.

In 2022, the society reported 6579 members.

The society has branches in Scotland, Ireland, and Wales.

The society's Mills Section is concerned with the protection, repair, and continued use of traditional windmills and watermills. Ken Major carried out much work on its behalf.

An annual award honours the memory of church enthusiast and SPAB member Sir John Betjeman. The award is presented for outstanding repairs to the fabric of places of worship in England and Wales completed in the last 18 months.

See also
 Ancient Monuments Society
 The Georgian Group
 Building Preservation Trust
 Building preservation and conservation trusts in the UK
 Architectural Heritage Society of Scotland
 Scottish Civic Trust

References

Further reading
 Miele, Chris, Ed. (2005) From William Morris. Building Conservation and the Arts and Crafts Cult of Authenticity 1877–1939.  New Haven and London: Yale University Press. 
 Donovan, Andrea (2007) William Morris and the Society for the Protection of Ancient Buildings. London: Routledge. 
 Vallance, Aymer (1897/1995) The Life and Work of William Morris. George Bell and Sons 1897. Reprint Studio Editions. London. 1995. 
 Beatty, Claudius J.P. (1995) Thomas Hardy: Conservation Architect – His Work for the Society for the Protection of Ancient Buildings. Dorset Natural History and Archaeological Society. 
 Lethaby, W.R.(1935/1979) Philip Webb and His Work.  Oxford University Press 1935. Reprint Raven Oak Press. London. 1979. 
 MacCarthy, Fiona (1994) William Morris. A Life for Our Time. London:Faber and Faber. 
 Snell, Reginald (1986) William Weir and Dartington Hall.  Dartington Hall Trust.

External links
 

1877 establishments in England
Architecture in England
Clubs and societies in London
Charities based in London
Heritage organisations in England
Heritage organisations in Scotland
Architectural history
Conservation and restoration organizations